Jiuquan, formerly known as Suzhou, is a prefecture-level city in the northwesternmost part of Gansu Province in the People's Republic of China. At the end of 2021, the province's resident population was 24.9002 million, a decrease of 110,000 compared with the end of the previous year, of which: male population was 12.6601 million, female population was 12.2401 million, and the population sex ratio was 103.43 (females were 100).

Name

The city was formerly known as Fulu, which became known as Suzhou (Suchow, Su-chow, &c.) after it became the seat of Su Prefecture under the Sui. As the seat of Jiuquan Commandery, it eventually became known by that name in turn. The name Jiuquan —"wine spring(s)" — derives from a legendary story of the young Han general Huo Qubing, who was said to have poured a vat of precious wine into a local creek to share its taste with his troops after a victory over the Xiongnu nomads.

History
Fulu was founded in 111 BC as an outpost in the Hexi Corridor near the Jade Gate along the overland Silk Road. Jiuquan was a Han prefecture and, under the Eastern Han, an active military garrison. Su Prefecture was established under the Sui and renamed Jiuquan Commandery under the Tang. In 624, Jiuquan County was established. In 763, it was occupied by Tibetan Empire. After the fall of the Tibetan Empire, it was controlled by the Ganzhou Uyghur Kingdom. In 1028, it was seized by Xixia. During the Yuan Dynasty, Suzhou Lu was established under Gansu Province. It sometimes served as the capital of the province of Gansu. Along with its role protecting trade along the Silk Road, Suzhou was the great center of the rhubarb trade.

Under the Ming, Suzhou was the site where the Portuguese Jesuit missionary Bento de Góis was robbed and died in 1607 during the exploration that finally established that Cathay and China were a single country. Meng Qiaofang took it from Ding Guodong in 1649. The Hui under Ma Wenlu held it during the Dungan Revolt. It was completely destroyed by the time it was recovered by the Qing general Zuo Zongtang in 1873 but it was swiftly rebuilt.

Administrative divisions
Jiuquan is made up of one district, two counties, two autonomous counties and two country-level cities.

Geography and Climate
Jiuquan occupies the westernmost part of Gansu, bordering Zhangye City to the east, Qinghai to the south, Xinjiang to the west, Ejin Banner, Alxa league of Inner Mongolia and Mongolia to the north.

Jiuquan has a cold desert climate (Köppen BWk), with long, cold winters, and hot, somewhat dry summers. The diurnal temperature variation is relatively large, averaging  annually. With sunny weather and low humidity dominating year-round, the area hosts one of the launch sites for the PRC's space programme. With monthly percent possible sunshine ranging from 62% in July to 77% in October, the city receives 3,031 hours of bright sunshine annually.

Transport 
Jiuquan is served by China National Highway 312 and the Lanzhou-Xinjiang (Lanxin) Railway. The Lanxin Railway has several side branches within Jiuquan Prefecture. In particular, a railway branch runs from the Liugou Station in Guazhou County to Dunhuang, serving both Guazhou county seat and Dunhuang. There are plans to expand it further south into Qinghai; the extension, known as the Golmud–Dunhuang Railway, will connect Dunhuang to Golmud, Qinghai on the Qinghai–Tibet railway.
There is also the  Jiayuguan–Ceke branch, which runs through the desert areas of Jiuquan Prefecture's Jinta County.

Jiuquan is also served by Jiuquan Airport. There is also Dunhuang Airport in Dunhuang.

Space launch center 

Jiuquan is the closest major city to the Jiuquan Satellite Launch Center. It was built in 1958; the first Chinese human spaceflight, Shenzhou 5 was launched there on 15 October 2003, making Yang Liwei China's first astronaut and a national hero. The second was in 2005.

Culture
Jiuquan is known within China as the first site of rhubarb cultivation.

See also

 Silk Route Museum
 Mogao Caves

Notes

References
 
 
 Hill, John E. (2009) Through the Jade Gate to Rome: A Study of the Silk Routes during the Later Han Dynasty, 1st to 2nd Centuries CE. BookSurge, Charleston, South Carolina. .
 Winchester, Simon (2008). The Man Who Loved China. HarperCollins, New York. .

External links

Rocket launch site—Astronautix

 
Prefecture-level divisions of Gansu
111 BC
110s BC establishments
Populated places established in the 2nd century BC
Cities in Gansu
Populated places along the Silk Road